Mr. & Mrs. X is a 12-issue comic book limited series published by Marvel Comics between September 2018 and June 2019. Created by writer Kelly Thompson and artists Oscar Bazaldua & Javier Pina, it starred the popular X-Men characters Gambit and Rogue as they settle into married life. The series received generally positive reviews from comic critics.

Publication history
X-Men Gold #30, was advertised as a comic featuring the marriage of Kitty Pryde and Colossus, but it instead featured the surprise marriage of Rogue and Gambit. This led to a new comic book starring the duo, Mr. & Mrs. X. This followed on from the storyline of the five-issue miniseries Rogue & Gambit, also written by Thompson,

Plot
Rogue and Gambit decide to get married and luckily Beast is able to build her a power-dampening necklace to allow her to kiss at the wedding ceremony and enjoy their honeymoon in space, which is cut short by a distress signal from Kitty Pryde. There was a distress signal from Cerise, who is transporting a package from the Shi'ar Imperial Guard. They are rescued by Deadpool and discover the egg is the progeny of Lilandra and Professor X. They continue to protect the offspring, which chooses to be called Xandra, from Technet and Warbird's Shi'ar rebellion. A large battle ensues between all four factions, but Xandra is able to create a psychic illusion that she died, but then goes under the care of Cerise. During this psychic explosion Rogue realizes she can absorb powers without touching now.

Gambit & Rogue try to enjoy their wedding reception, but are teleported to Mojoverse. Rogue is comatose due to the fear gripping her with her new uncontrollable powers, so Spiral, who is enslaved by Mojo, helps her review her inner psyche in exchange for Gambit finding her missing soul shard. Rogue is called away from Captain Marvel, so Gambit then travels to meet with his father Jean-Luc, but gets captured by Candra, the new head of the Assassin's Guild and Bella Donna, his ex-wife and chief of the Thieves' Guild. Candra betrays Bella Donna, and Rogue and Jean-Luc come to the rescue. The series concludes with Rogue and Gambit finally able to enjoy some time alone.

Critical reception
The series received generally positive reviews, averaging 8.3 out of 10 according to review aggregator Comic Book Roundup.

Collected editions

References

Fictional married couples
Superhero duos
X-Men titles
Marvel Comics limited series